Sechs Schwedinnen im Pensionat (released in the UK as Six Swedish Girls in a Boarding School and in the US as Six Swedes on a Campus) is a 1979 Swiss pornographic film written and directed by Erwin C. Dietrich. It stars Brigitte Lahaie, Lynn Monteil, France Lomay, Danielle Troger, Kathleen Kane and Elsa Maroussia. The film was followed by High Test Girls.

Cast
 Brigitte Lahaie as Greta
 Lynn Monteil as Inga
 France Lomay as Kerstin
 Danielle Troger as Lil
 Kathleen Kane  as Astrid
 Elsa Maroussia as Selma
 Eric Falk as Karl, der Angler
 Anne Libert as Fräulein Klein

Reception
The website B Movies Heroes said that the film was "a useless movie, but all in all, it's funny if contextualized". Ian Jane from Rock!Shock!Pop also found the movie funny, stating, "Despite the fact that it's quite explicit (though never heads into full on hardcore territory) the best way to describe this movie is fun. There's a goofy, infectious free-spirited feeling to all of this and because of this, we never really question the morality of anyone involved in the naked shenanigans, we just go along for the ride. Everyone involved in the picture seems to be having a great time, and you can very clearly see some completely genuine smiles on the faces of the six female leads as they run (in slow motion, naturally) completely naked through the woods, and in quite a few of the other scenes as well. And of course, those girls are the main reason most would seek this film out – they're all beautiful and while their Swedish roots are certainly more than questionable, it's pretty much impossible not to get a kick out of their antics". Jane also praised the camera work and the "creative cinematography", but panned the film's score, concluding, "There is great camera work featured throughout and some creative cinematography helps to keep things interesting from a framing and composition perspective. The score is repetitive and more than a little familiar to those familiar with his sexploitation output from this period but it works and it suits everything rather well. On top of that, the comedy that is worked into the storyline is actually pretty funny. This one comes together in ways that a lot of similar films don't, and for that reason it's a bit of a softcore classic."

References

External links
 

1979 films
1970s pornographic films
1970s sex comedy films
Swiss pornographic films
Films directed by Erwin C. Dietrich
1979 comedy films
Swiss comedy films